Sports medicine is a branch of medicine that deals with physical fitness and the treatment and prevention of injuries related to sports and exercise. Although most sports teams have employed team physicians for many years, it is only since the late 20th century that sports medicine emerged as a distinct field of health care. In some countries, sports medicine (or sport and exercise medicine) is a recognized medical specialty (with similar training and standards to other medical specialties). In the majority of countries where sports medicine is recognized and practiced, it is a physician (non-surgical) specialty, but in some (such as the USA), it can equally be a surgical or non-surgical medical specialty, and also a specialty field within primary care. In other contexts, the field of sports medicine encompasses the scope of both medical specialists and also allied health practitioners who work in the field of sport, such as physiotherapists, athletic trainers, podiatrists and exercise physiologists.

Scope

Sports medicine can refer to the specific medical specialty or subspecialty of several medical and research disciplines in sports. Sports medicine may be called Sport and Exercise Medicine (SEM), which is now well established in many countries. It can broadly also refer to physicians, scientists, trainers, and other paramedical practitioners who work in a broad setting. Sports medicine specialists include a broad range of professions. All sports medicine specialists have one main goal in mind, and that is preventing future injuries and to improve the function of that area to return to everyday life. They work with all different types of people, and not just athletes. The various sports medicine experts often work together as a team to ensure the best recovery plan for the individual. Team members can include orthopedic surgeons, certified athletic trainers, sports physical therapists, physical medicine and rehabilitation specialists, and specialty SEM physicians.

Specializing in the treatment of athletes and other physically active individuals, SEM physicians have extensive education in musculoskeletal medicine. SEM doctors treat injuries such as muscle, ligament, tendon and bone problems, but may also treat chronic illnesses that can affect physical performance, such as asthma and diabetes. SEM doctors also advise on managing and preventing injuries.

European templates for SEM specialization generally recommend four years of experience in:

 internal medicine with special emphasis on cardiology, emergency medicine and clinical nutrition
 orthopedics and traumatology
 physical and rehabilitation medicine
 fellowship at a recognized sports medicine centre.

Related medical specialties

 Exercise medicine
 Podiatric Medicine & Surgery
 Sports cardiology
 Emergency medicine
 Lifestyle medicine
 General practice
 Adolescent medicine
 Physical medicine and rehabilitation
 Rheumatology
 Orthopaedic sports medicine
 Pediatrics
 Occupational medicine

Establishment as a medical specialty

Historical roots of sports medicine
Although sports medicine was only established formally as a specialty in the 20th Century, the history of doctors having involvement in treating athletes goes back to ancient times in Greek, Roman and Egyptian societies.

Modern establishment of the specialty
The Italian version of this page Medicina dello sport states that Sports Medicine societies were first established in Switzerland (1922) followed by: Germany (1924), France (1929) and Italy (1929) (Italian Sports Medicine Federation). In Germany in the 1920s, an attempt was made to upskill thousands of doctors and other health professionals in sport and exercise medicine, without establishing it as a distinct specialty at that stage, but it failed due to lack of funding in the Depression. Sports medicine was established as a specialty in Italy, the first country to do so, in 1958. The European Union of Medical Specialists has defined necessary training requirements for the establishment of the specialty of Sports Medicine in a given European country. It is a goal of the European Federation of Sports Medicine Associations to eventually establish Sports Medicine as a specialty in all European countries.

In Australia and New Zealand, Sport and Exercise Medicine is a stand-alone medical specialty, with the Australasian College of Sport and Exercise Physicians being one of Australia's 15 recognized medical specialty Colleges.

The USA (and many other countries) follow the model of recognizing Sports Medicine as an official subspecialty of multiple other primary medical specialties.

Public health
SEM physicians are frequently involved in promoting the therapeutic benefits of physical activity, exercise and sport for the individuals and communities. SEM Physicians in the UK spend a period of their training in public health, and advise public health physicians on matters relating to physical activity promotion.

Common sports injuries

Common sports injuries that can result in seeing a sports medicine specialist are knee and shoulder injuries, fractures, ankle sprains, concussions, cartilage injuries, and more. A sports medicine specialist can also be seen for advice in other areas of health, like nutrition, exercise, supplements, and how to prevent injuries before they occur. A sports medicine specialist works to help make the performance of the athlete more advanced, as well as ensuring their safety while performing the activity. Sports injuries generally affect soft tissue or bones within the body and are commonly treated without surgery.

Treatment for sports injuries 
Different types of sports injuries require different treatments and major injuries involve surgery, but most do not. Common treatments include medication, such as pain relievers or anti-inflammatory medication, icing, physical therapy, and/or immobilization of the injured area. Physical therapy is used to get the injured area back into regular movements and to reduce the discomfort of the affected area. PRICE is an acronym that is used for the common treatment of these injuries. It stands for protection, rest, ice, compression, and elevation.

Controversies in sports medicine

Concussion in sport

The management of concussion in sport has been extremely controversial over the past 20 years due to the discovery and reporting of Chronic traumatic encephalopathy as a disease that is common in ex-athletes, particularly footballers. Sporting codes have been accused of being complicit in understating the long-term damage caused by concussions by allowing too many head impacts to occur and for the players to be able to return to play too quickly after received concussions. A seminal series of consensus papers has been the international guidelines on the management of concussion in sport. These consensus statements have been seen on the positive side as being sports medicine leaders moving the management of concussion in a more conservative direction over time and encouraging a standard set of tests and assessments. On the negative side, they have been seen as conflicted and allowing return to play too rapidly.

Transgender people in sport

Whether male-to-female transgender athletes can safely and fairly participate in women's sport at the elite and community levels is a highly charged and controversial topic. The sports medicine world is not united in its views and although this debate well and truly involves medical input, it is as much a social controversy as it is a medical one.

Drugs in sport

Doping in sport has a long history with doctors in the sports medicine world being both heroes and villains on different occasions. The presence of trained sports medicine professionals at elite sporting events has been critical in the fight against doping, but sometimes doctors become the enablers of doping and are part of the scandal themselves.

Sports scandals involving medicine

Major scandals where doctors were prominent include:
 Bloodgate
 USA Gymnastics sex abuse scandal
 Operación Puerto doping case
 Biogenesis scandal
 Eva Carneiro scandal, involving Chelsea F.C. and José Mourinho

Allied health team members

Different medical professionals for sports injuries require different forms of training, but for sports injuries, they mainly all work with the diagnosis and treatment of these injuries. All sports medicine professionals work with people of all age ranges, professional athletes, or even adolescents playing any sport. The main two allied health professions for sports injuries are athletic trainers (in the USA) and physical therapists (physiotherapists) in most other countries.

Athletic trainer
Athletic trainers are typically part of a sports medicine team in the US in particular, providing primary care, injury and illness prevention, wellness promotion, emergency care, therapeutic intervention and rehabilitation to injuries. When an athlete is injured, an athletic trainer is key to treatment and rehabilitation working closely with the athlete throughout rehabilitation. Athletic trainers are often the ones who assess the injury first and provide initial care.

Physiotherapist
Physiotherapists are a primary sports medicine team member in most countries of the world. Physiotherapists can specialize in many areas with sports physiotherapy as a major subspecialty. Physiotherapists are a main factor in the recovery stage of an injury as they set up an individualized recovery plan. Physiotherapy is underfunded within most health systems so that it is generally much more accessible in higher-income countries and, even within these countries, is much more accessible to higher-income earners. In countries like Denmark and Australia there are many more physiotherapists than in lower-income countries.

Podiatrist 
Podiatrists treat issues related to the foot or ankle, which is a common area where athletes get injuries. They specialize in the diagnosis and treatment of foot-related issues by performing tests and referring physical therapists. Podiatrists can also perform surgeries or prescribe medication as forms of treatment.

Other practitioners 
All of Exercise physiologists, Strength and conditioning coaches, personal trainers, Chiropractors, Osteopaths, Sports psychologists and Sports nutritionists/dietitians can be part of the Sport and Exercise Medicine team.

Journals

See also

 Exercise physiology
 Physical therapy
 Sports injuries

References

Further reading 
 

 
Orthopedic surgical procedures